Chenistonia is a genus of spiders in the family Anamidae. It was first described in 1901 by Hogg. , it contains 8 species, all from Australia.

Species

Chenistonia comprises 8 species:
Chenistonia boranup Main, 2012 — Australia (Western Australia)
Chenistonia caeruleomontana (Raven, 1984) — Australia (New South Wales)
Chenistonia earthwatchorum (Raven, 1984) — Australia (Queensland)
Chenistonia hickmani (Raven, 1984) — Australia (New South Wales)
Chenistonia maculata Hogg, 1901 — Australia (Victoria)
Chenistonia montana (Raven, 1984) — Australia (New South Wales)
Chenistonia trevallynia Hickman, 1926 — Australia (Tasmania)
Chenistonia tropica (Raven, 1984) — Australia (Queensland)

References

Anamidae
Mygalomorphae genera
Spiders of Australia